The Super Ligue, formerly known as Ligue 1, is the top division of football in Niger. There are 14 teams competing in the league, which operates on a system of promotion and relegation with the Ligue Nationale.

The league began in 1966, with Secteur 6 winning the first five championships. It was known as the Ligue 1 between 2010 and 2018, when it changed its name to Super Ligue.

History
Although the championship has been contested since 1966, the structure has changed over time, and a number of years the competition has been canceled or shortened. In 2002, the league was completely cancelled.

Several major clubs dropped out in 2004 and 2005 for financial reasons and because of the 2005 famine afflicting the south center of the nation. In 2004, for instance, three clubs in the first round were disqualified, and more than two dozen matches were annulled or awarded after the fact for a variety of offences.

Since the 1990s, the clubs compete in a group stage, the winners of which advance to the "Super League" which contests the second half of the season, with the losers contesting a league to determine what clubs will be relegated to the Regional leagues. The Leagues in each of the Nigerien regions (called the Nigerien D2 Championships) then send champions to a play-off to determine which two clubs will be promoted.

Historically, Niamey has had the most accomplished regional league, and has provided most clubs in the national championship. Only two clubs from outside Niamey have ever won the championship. The Ligue de Niamey has been powerful enough that, after disputes over relegation on 2000, five Niamey clubs formed their own rival competition (the "Coupe des Sponsors"), and played only the Ligue de Niamey championship in the 2002 season, when the Nigerien Football Federation cancelled the season due to funding shortfalls.

Current clubs (2021−22 season)

Previous champions

1966: Secteur 6 (Niamey)
1967: Secteur 6 (Niamey)
1968: Secteur 6 (Niamey)
1969: Secteur 6 (Niamey)
1970: Secteur 6 (Niamey)
1971: AS FAN (Niamey)
1972: no championship
1973: Secteur 7 (Niamey)
1974: Sahel SC (Niamey)
1975: AS FAN (Niamey)
1976: Olympic FC (Niamey)
1977: Olympic FC (Niamey)
1978: Olympic FC (Niamey)
1979: no championship
1980: AS Niamey (Niamey)
1981: AS Niamey (Niamey)
1982: AS Niamey (Niamey)
1983: Jangorzo FC (Maradi)
1984: Espoir FC (Zinder)
1985: Zumunta AC (Niamey) 
1986: Sahel SC (Niamey)
1987: Sahel SC (Niamey)
1988: Zumunta AC (Niamey)
1989: Olympic FC (Niamey)
1990: Sahel SC (Niamey)
1991: Sahel SC (Niamey)
1992: Sahel SC (Niamey)
1993: Zumunta AC (Niamey)
1994: Sahel SC  (Niamey)
1995: no championship
1996: Sahel SC  (Niamey)
1997–98: Olympic FC (Niamey)
1999: Olympic FC (Niamey)
2000: JS du Ténéré (Niamey)
2001: JS du Ténéré (Niamey)
2002: no championship
2003: Sahel SC (Niamey)
2004: Sahel SC (Niamey)
2004–05: AS-FNIS (Niamey)
2005–06: AS-FNIS (Niamey)
2006–07: Sahel SC (Niamey)
2008: AS Police (Niamey)
2009: Sahel SC (Niamey)
2010: AS FAN (Niamey)
2010–11: AS GNN (Niamey)
2011–12: Olympic FC (Niamey)
2012–13: AS Douanes (Niamey)
2013–14: AS GNN (Niamey)
2014–15: AS Douanes (Niamey)
2015–16: AS FAN (Niamey)
2016–17: AS FAN (Niamey)
2017–18: AS SONIDEP (Niamey)
2018–19: AS SONIDEP (Niamey)
2019–20: abandoned
2020–21: US Gendarmerie Nationale (Niamey)
2021–22: ASN Nigelec (Niamey)

Performance by club

References

External links
 League at fifa.com
 RSSSF competition history
Rec Sports Soccer Foundation: Niger 2008: Championnat national de première division.
UEMOA Cup, Niger qualifying page, 2008.

 
Football leagues in Niger
Niger
1966 establishments in Niger
Sports leagues established in 1966